David Saint  Peter (born January 3, 1967 in Bismarck, North Dakota) has served as president of the Minnesota Twins of Major League Baseball since 2002.

St. Peter was born in Bismarck, North Dakota, and attended St. Mary's Central High School in Bismarck and the University of North Dakota. He joined the Twins organization in 1990.

References

External links

Twin Cities Business

Living people
Minnesota Twins executives
Major League Baseball team presidents
University of North Dakota alumni
1967 births
Sportspeople from Bismarck, North Dakota